Stefan Edberg was the defending champion, but lost in the second round this year.

Boris Becker won the title, defeating Peter Lundgren 6–4, 6–1, 6–1 in the final.

Seeds

  Mats Wilander (third round)
  Stefan Edberg (second round)
  Boris Becker (champion)
  Miloslav Mečíř (second round)
  Thomas Muster (third round)
  Kevin Curren (second round)
  Emilio Sánchez (quarterfinals)
  Anders Järryd (second round)
  Jonas Svensson (third round)
  Mikael Pernfors (third round)
  John Fitzgerald (second round)
  Ronald Agénor (second round)
  Slobodan Živojinović (first round)
  Magnus Gustafsson (third round)
  Dan Goldie (semifinals)
  Derrick Rostagno (first round)

Draw

Finals

Top half

Section 1

Section 2

Bottom half

Section 3

Section 4

External links
 ATP main draw

Stockholm Open
1988 Grand Prix (tennis)